The 2007–08 Serbian Cup season is the second season of Serbia's football knockout competition. Red Star, the holders of the Lav Kup Srbije, began the tournament as favorites to lift the cup again. It seemed as though Red Star where on their way to winning the cup again having passed all stages with class. Then came the semifinal clash with arch-rival Partizan in what many considered the game of the tournament. The match came with much controversy due to a goal Red Star scored late that was flagged for offside. The replays clearly showed that Red Star's midfielder Nenad Milijaš was on, but what made matters worse was the fact that the referee apologized to him and admitted that he had made a mistake. Several days after the incident the side judge retired from refereeing and openly apologized to Red Star and the supporters of the team. In the final Partizan went on to face heavy underdog FK Zemun, who had a miracle run in the cup which included three wins from penalty shootouts on their road to the final. Zemun's luck ran out however, as Partizan cruised to a 3–0 victory to claim their tenth domestic cup.

Individual awards

Round of 32
The draw for the Round of 32 was held on September 15, 2007. All of the matches for this round  were played on September 26, 2007. The teams in bold won.

Round of 16
The draw for the Round of 16 was held on October 9, 2007 with all of the participating clubs in attendance except for Red Star who had to attend the UEFA Cup draw in Nyon, Switzerland. Radnički Niš vs Banat kicked off this round on October 23, 2007 with Banat being the first side to book their spot into the quarterfinals. All of the remaining matches for this round were played on October 24, 2007. Red Star vs Napredak was postponed because Red Star requested the delay due to them having a crucial UEFA Cup group stage match against German giants Bayern Munich the next day. The game was later rescheduled for February 23, 2008 and the result was a predictable victory for Red Star.

Quarter-finals
The draw for the quarterfinals was held on February 28, 2008 and it paired several great matches, including two that went to penalty shootouts. The matches took place on March 19, 2008 and the teams in bold  advanced to the semi-finals.

Semi-finals
The draw for the Semifinals was held on March 28, 2008 at the Šumarice Hotel in Kragujevac, Serbia. Red Star and arch-rivals Partizan were drawn against each other in the semifinals for the second consecutive year. The other match pitted OFK Beograd against the surprise team of the tournament Zemun. Both matches were played on April 16, 2008 and the teams in bold advanced to the Lav Kup Final.

Final
The Lav Kup final match was played at Partizan Stadium, on May 7, 2008. Partizan played against second division side FK Zemun. Partizan already considered favorites then received an even bigger edge with the Serbian FA's decision to switch the final to Partizan's home ground. It was initially supposed to be at Red Star's stadium but was later moved. The huge underdogs began the match poorly and where controlled by Partizan. After only 12 minutes Lamine Diarra put Partizan in front. Zemun seemed to be content with only being down one and both sides played passively until Diarra struck again 4 minutes before half time. The second half saw huge changes in Zemun's play. Zemun pushed more players forward and began creating opportunities but Partizan's defense was too good and Partizan seemed happy with playing off the counterattack which ended up being a great decision as Partizan would grab a third. After several last gasp efforts by Zemun, Darko Maletić crossed a dangerous ball in extra time which Diarra headed in for his third of the match. Shortly after the final whistle blew, and Partizan players and fans began celebrating their first Cup win since 2000–01.

External links
 Official website of the Serbian Cup
 Zemun ready to live cup final dream, UEFA.com, May 6, 2008
 Partizan lako do 10. kupa, B92, May 7, 2008
 Jokanović: Nema vremena za slavlje, Kustudić: Ovo je bila naša lepa bajka, B92, May 7, 2008
 Lav Kup: Jovšić i Dijara najbolji, B92, May 19, 2008

Serbian Cup seasons
Serbian Cup
Cup